China Electronics Corporation (CEC) is a Chinese state-owned company and one of the largest producers of telecom equipment in China for both civilian and military purposes. CEC has four main semiconductor divisions: computer software/hardware & system integration, telecommunication network & terminals and digital home appliances.

History 
CEC acquired the mobile phone division of Philips in 2007. At the time, the Philips division had an annual revenue of 400 million euros and 240 employees. CEC received the right to sell mobile phones under Philips license.

Philips already moved its mobile phones production in China in 2001, when the production, research and development of mobile phones was taken by a joint-venture of Philips and China Electronics Corporation. Romania was the first country in the European Union where such mobile phones were sold since 2013, until then the phones were available only in the BRIC states (Brazil, Russia, India and China).

U.S. investment prohibition 
In August, 2020, the United States Department of Defense published the names of companies with links to the People's Liberation Army operating directly or indirectly in the United States. CEC was included on the list. In November 2020, Donald Trump issued an executive order prohibiting any American company or individual from owning shares in companies that the U.S. Department of Defense has listed as having links to the People's Liberation Army, which included CEC.

References

External links 

Mobile phone manufacturers
Semiconductor companies of China
Government-owned companies of China
Defence companies of China